The boys' freestyle 55 kg competition at the 2018 Summer Youth Olympics was held on 14 October, at the Asia Pavilion.

Competition format 
As there were less than six wrestlers in a weight category, the pool phase will be run as a single group competing in a round-robin format.  Ranking within the groups is used to determine the pairings for the final phase.

Schedule 
All times are in local time (UTC-3).

Results 
 Legend
 F — Won by fall

Group Stages

Group A

Group B

Finals

Final rankings

References

External links 

 Schedule
 Sheet

Wrestling at the 2018 Summer Youth Olympics